Sharing 分享 (Pinyin: Fēn Xiǎng) is the video compilation album (fourth album overall) by winner of Malaysian Idol 2, Danell Lee Chieh Hun, released on 27 September 2008. This is also the first album released under the artiste's new name, which was formerly Daniel Lee Chee Hun (李吉汉 Lǐ Jíhàn).

In reality, it features more of a compilation of songs from his past 3 albums, Daniel Lee Chee Hun, Unavoidable and Pasti, with the inclusion of 2 new songs. What makes this album special is that the entire compilation comes in the form of a karaoke DVD containing MVs of all 15 songs plus a bonus audio CD that contains the 2 newer songs. The 15 MVs are also accompanied with their respective karaoke versions.

Karaoke DVD MV listing

Bonus audio CD track listing
我的志愿 (My Aspiration)
On Every Line

Name change
During the album's first meet-the-fans session on September 27, 2008 at Berjaya Times Square, Danell announced the change of both his Chinese and English names, which he done secretly in August. This was done due to popular Chinese belief that a change in the name may bring better luck and Danell himself actually experienced better luck after 'trying out' his new name for a month and thus officially adopting it.

Danell himself admitted that he has refused to become the 'sweet boy' after 3 years in the entertainment scene and would like to try on more mature-toned songs. This was clearly shown in his MV for 我的志愿 (My Aspiration)

References

External links
Danell Lee Sharing Album Lyrics

2008 compilation albums
Daniel Lee Chee Hun video albums
Daniel Lee Chee Hun compilation albums
Sony BMG compilation albums
Mandarin-language albums
Mandopop compilation albums